Air New Zealand Flight 4374 was a flight from Gisborne which crashed while landing at Auckland, killing two of the four on board.

Aircraft
The Fokker Friendship F27-500 was eight years old at the time of the crash. Until 1977 the aircraft had been operated by the New Zealand National Airways Corporation (NAC).

Crash
At 14:28 the aircraft had descended to 3000 feet and the pilots deployed the flaps. The aircraft's speed was 165 knots, and increased to 211 knots; 2 minutes 14 seconds later the aircraft crashed into the harbour killing two, the captain and a passenger.

Cause
The investigation found that the crew were misled by a visual illusion during conditions of reduced visibility into believing they were at a safe height and failed to see the flight instruments sufficiently to confirm a safe landing path.

References

External links
https://aviation-safety.net/database/record.php?id=19790217-1
http://www.airport-data.com/aircraft/photo/001075653L.html

1979 in New Zealand
Airliner accidents and incidents involving controlled flight into terrain
Accidents and incidents involving the Fokker F27
Aviation accidents and incidents in 1979
Air New Zealand accidents and incidents
Aviation accidents and incidents in New Zealand
1979 disasters in New Zealand